Pádraig Amond (born 15 April 1988) is an Irish professional footballer who plays as a striker for National League club Woking.

He began his career in his native Ireland with Shamrock Rovers, progressing through the club's youth academy before making his first-team debut in 2006. In his first season, he helped the team achieve promotion to the League of Ireland Premier Division. After a spell on loan to Kildare County, Amond established himself in the first-team and was named the club's Young Player of the Year in 2008. He joined Sligo Rovers in 2010, scoring 23 goals in his only season and winning both the League of Ireland Cup and the FAI Cup.

Amond signed for Portuguese club Paços de Ferreira in 2010 but never made a first-team start for the team and moved to English League Two club Accrington Stanley, initially on loan, after less than a year. He joined Morecambe in 2013, scoring 21 goals in all competitions during a two-year spell before being released, joining Grimsby Town. At Grimsby, he enjoyed the most prolific season of his career by scoring 30 league goals in the National League, as he helped the team achieve promotion to the English Football League after winning the 2016 National League play-off Final. He left the club after one season to join Hartlepool United but suffered relegation to the National League in 2017.

Following a spell with Hartlepool, Amond enjoyed a four-year stint with Newport County for which he collated over 200 appearances before making the move to National League, Woking in July 2022. He has represented Ireland at under-21 level, winning four caps in 2008.

Career

Shamrock Rovers
Amond joined Shamrock Rovers in 1999, at the age of 10, and progressed through the schoolboy ranks of the club. He was part of the team that were champions of the League of Ireland First Division in the 2006 season, being promoted to the League of Ireland Premier Division. He was promoted to the senior squad at the start of the season, making his League of Ireland debut as a substitute against Athlone Town on 16 March 2006. He scored his only goal against Finn Harps in September 2006. He made ten appearances, eight from the bench, for the whole season.

Amond also represented his native county of Carlow at hurling. In 2005, he led the team to victory in the All-Ireland Minor B Hurling Championship and, the following year, he played at minor (under-18) level, reaching the Leinster final at Croke Park. In 2006, he signed his first professional contract with Shamrock Rovers and, in order to keep playing for Carlow, he was left out of team photos and listed under a false name, Brendan Amond, in the matchday programmes to avoid being spotted. The ruse was eventually discovered when his picture appeared in a newspaper following a victory. Having long resisted advice from coaches to focus on football he eventually gave up hurling after discussions with manager Pat Scully.

Amond joined Kildare County on a season-long loan for the 2007 season. He scored twice on 8 April 2007 in what was Kildare County's first victory of the season in a 2–2 draw against Wexford Youths, he got their first within four minutes after goalkeeper Shane Dunphy fumbled a Gary Walsh corner-kick leaving Amond to shoot from close range; in the 90th minute Amond scored an equalising penalty. He became the first opposition player to score at Athlone Town's new stadium at Lissywollen in the League of Ireland First Division on 16 April 2007, in a 2–0 away win. His final goal while on his loan spell came on 27 April 2007 against Kilkenny City. He scored five goals for Kildare before being recalled by Shamrock Rovers.

Following his return, Amond scored Shamrock Rovers' 4000th league goal in a 4–0 win over Galway United on 14 September 2007. He made six league appearances in the 2007 season along with an appearance in the 2007 League of Ireland Cup. He scored his first goal of the 2008 season on 18 April and followed it with another three weeks later. On 8 June 2008, he scored the first goal of a 2–1 victory against Sligo Rovers in the third round of the 2008 FAI Cup. Amond finished as Shamrock Rovers' top goalscorer with nine league goals in the 2008 season and won the club's Young Player of the Year award.

Amond made his first appearance for the 2009 season on 3 April, in the fifth match of the season, during a 2–2 draw with Drogheda United. On 10 May 2009, he scored the first two goals within 4 minutes, in a 3–0 win against Sligo Rovers. His final league goal for the club came on 2 October 2009 with the winner in the 1–0 victory over Bohemians. He made twenty league appearances and scored four goals in the 2009 season.

Sligo Rovers
In December 2009, he signed for Sligo Rovers. Amond played in the 2009–10 Setanta Sports Cup, scoring the third goal in the 86th minute on his competitive debut for Sligo, in a 3–0 win over Cliftonville. He also played in both legs of the semi-final against St Patrick's Athletic, where they lost 6–2 on aggregate.

Amond played three matches as part of the team that won the 2010 FAI Cup. He also played three matches and scored five goals as part of the squad that won the final of the 2010 League of Ireland Cup, including a brace in a 6–0 victory over Ulster Senior League team Letterkenny Rovers in the Second Round of the cup on 11 May 2010. On 1 June 2010, he scored Sligo's fourth goal in a 4–1 victory over St Patrick's Athletic, shooting past their keeper Dan Connor to confirm a place in the last four. On 17 August 2010, Amond continued his goal scoring run with a brace in a 2–1 victory against his former club Shamrock Rovers in the semi-finals.

Paços de Ferreira
Amond was subject of a bid from Portuguese Primeira Liga club Paços de Ferreira in August 2010, which was rejected by Sligo Rovers. However, in September 2010 the club made an improved offer, which Sligo accepted and Amond signed on a three-year contract for an undisclosed fee. He made his debut as a substitute in a home match against Braga on 19 September, helping his team haul back a two-goal deficit to draw the match 2–2. He also made one appearance in the 2010–11 Taça de Portugal, coming on as a substitute in the 87th minute during the 3–1 victory against São João de Vêr. On 10 November 2010, he made his second start and scored his first goal for Paços de Ferreira against Leixões in the Portuguese League Cup.

Amond made a total of 17 league appearances for Paços, but with all of them coming from the substitutes' bench, it meant that he played a total of just under 300 minutes. In his final appearance for the club, he set up his team's equaliser in a 3–3 draw away to FC Porto.

Accrington Stanley
On 26 August 2011, Amond signed for English League Two club Accrington Stanley on a season-long loan deal. Prior to signing, he had spent a week on trial with League One club Sheffield Wednesday. Amond scored his first goal for Accrington in a 3–2 Football League Trophy win against Carlisle United when he came off the bench in the 70th minute and scored an equaliser four minutes from time. During his ninth appearance, he scored his first league goal for the club, a 67th-minute header from close range to equalise 2–2 against Plymouth Argyle.

After a successful loan spell the previous season, on 13 August 2012, Amond signed a one-year deal with Accrington Stanley. He scored his first goal of the 2012–13 campaign in a 2–0 win at home to Port Vale on 21 August 2012, a penalty kick in the 43rd minute after his strike partner Karl Sheppard was brought down by the Vale goalkeeper. Amond had been struggling with groin, abductor and hip problems since January 2013, which limited him to brief substitute appearances from the bench until the beginning of April.

Morecambe
After leaving Accrington Stanley, Amond went on trial with Morecambe; he signed for Morecambe on 1 August 2013, on a free transfer after a successful trial period. On 31 August 2013 Amond scored his first goal for Morecambe in the 2–1 win against Plymouth Argyle, a left-footed volley from 15 yards out past Luke McCormick seven minutes from time to give Morecambe their first Football League win over Argyle. On 5 October 2013, he scored the winning goal as Morecambe came back from 3–0 down, when with only six minutes to go Amond headed home from the centre of the box striker Jack Sampson's left-wing cross, which flew past visiting keeper Tommy Lee to beat league leaders Chesterfield 4–3 at the Globe Arena. Amond won Morecambe's Golden Boot award for the 2013–14 season, he finished their top goal-scorer with 11 goals in all competitions.

Amond scored on the opening day of the 2014–15 season in a 3–0 win over Dagenham & Redbridge. Fellow striker Jack Sampson was brought down in the box, Amond then dispatched the penalty to put them 2–0 ahead after 54 minutes. On 2 September 2014, Amond scored twice in the first round of the Football League Trophy. He scored an equaliser in the 28th minute and made it 3–1 eight minutes from time when he tapped in from close range after Chris Maxwell had saved Jack Sampson's close range effort. On 11 April 2015, Amond's eighth and final league goal of the campaign came in the 3–1 win over Portsmouth in the 92nd minute, scoring from 18 yards.

In May 2015, after the end of the 2014–15 season, Amond was released by Morecambe.

Grimsby Town
On 1 July 2015, Amond signed for National League club Grimsby Town on a one-year contract. Grimsby fended off interest from League of Ireland Premier Division champions Dundalk, NIFL Premiership club Linfield as well as a number of English clubs in League Two to sign Amond. On 8 August 2015, he scored a debut opening goal for Grimsby in the 43rd minute during a 2–2 draw against Kidderminster Harriers. Amond scored a brace in a 4–1 home win against Bromley, scoring the opener after three minutes when Nathan Arnold chested a cross into Amond's path who finished past the keeper into the bottom corner; he scored the math's third goal on 25 minutes, Arnold's cross was headed back goalwards by Josh Gowling at the far post and Amond volleyed into the roof of the net. On 13 October 2015, Amond netted his first hat-trick in English football and finished with 4 goals in a 7–0 victory against FC Halifax Town.

On 24 October 2015, Amond scored two goals in a 4–1 win against National League North team Harrogate Town in the fourth round qualifier of the FA Cup. His first came on 34 minutes when Conor Townsend beat three defenders, breaking into the box and playing the ball across for Amond to drive home; he scored the fourth goal for Grimsby in the 71st minute when substitute Jon-Paul Pittman played a one-two with Amond who found space in the box and side-footed home; his first goals in FA Cup competition. Amond came off the bench to score twice in the first round of the FA Cup against National League South team St Albans City, after replacing his usual strike partner Omar Bogle in the 43rd minute due to an injury; he scored the second goal of the match in the 45th minute latching onto a header back to the goalkeeper, he scored his second and the fifth goal in the 93rd minute, a header from the left side of the box.

Amond played in Grimsby's 3–1 victory over Forest Green Rovers in the 2016 National League play-off Final at Wembley Stadium, seeing Grimsby promoted to League Two after a six-year absence from the Football League. His efforts over the season earned him a place in the 2015–16 National League Team of the Year and named Grimsby's Player of the Year.

Hartlepool United
Amond was offered a one-year extension with Grimsby following the club's promotion but, on 20 June 2016, he signed for League Two club Hartlepool United on a two-year contract. He made his debut for the club on the opening day of the 2016–17 season in a 1–1 draw with Colchester United, scoring his first goal in his fourth appearance during a 3–3 draw with Crewe Alexandra on 16 August 2016. He went on to finish the season as the club's top goalscorer, with 14 goals in all competitions, including a brace against his former team Grimsby during a 3–0 victory on 1 October 2016. Hartlepool suffered relegation from the Football League on the final day of the 2016–17 season.

On the first day of pre-season training the following season, Amond placed a transfer request which was denied and he was informed by the club that he would not be allowed to leave. Hartlepool also rejected an offer from League Two club Newport County and verbally offered Amond a new contract, although no official deal was ever offered to him. Amond played in all four of Hartlepool's opening matches in the National League, scoring a penalty during a 2–1 defeat to Maidenhead United, but was accused by manager Craig Harrison of making himself unavailable for selection for a match against Bromley on 19 August in an attempt to force a transfer away from the club. Amond refuted the claims, stating that he had never refused to play and that the situation had left him "hating football". Hartlepool decided to back down from their previous stance regarding a transfer and manager Harrison telephoned Newport manager Michael Flynn to offer a move for Amond.

Newport County

2017–18 season
On 23 August 2017, Amond signed for League Two club Newport County on a two-year deal, with the option of a third, for an undisclosed fee. Newport manager Flynn stated that Amond had been a "key target" during the summer transfer window. The pair had met in the closing stages of the previous season as substitutes on opposing sides when Newport played Hartlepool and Flynn had praised Amond, telling him that if "he was the manager, [Amond] would be playing every week." The club was able to complete the deal using money earned from their EFL Cup tie against Championship side Leeds United. He made his debut on 26 August 2017 in a League Two match against Chesterfield, scoring the fourth goal in a 4–1 win.

On 27 January 2018, Amond scored against Premier League side Tottenham Hotspur in the third round of the FA Cup during a 1–1 draw at Rodney Parade. Tottenham won the replay 2–0. After scoring in the final match of the season, a 1–1 draw with Carlisle United, Amond finished as Newport's top goalscorer for the 2017–18 season with fourteen goals in all competitions.

2018–19 season
On 3 January 2019, Amond signed a contract extension at Newport until the end of the 2019–20 season. Three days later, Amond scored the winning goal, a penalty, against Premier League side Leicester City in the FA Cup 3rd round in a 2–1 victory. On 5 February 2019, Amond scored the second goal in Newport's 2–0 FA Cup fourth round replay win against Championship club Middlesbrough. In the following round, Amond scored Newport's goal in their 4–1 defeat against reigning Premier League champions Manchester City. Amond played in the 2019 EFL League Two play-off Final at Wembley Stadium where Newport lost to Tranmere Rovers, 1–0. Amond finished as Newport's top goalscorer for the 2018–19 season with twenty-four goals in all competitions and he was selected as the Newport County Player of the Year.

2019–20 season
In November 2019 Amond further extended his contract with Newport until June 2022. Amond was again top scorer for Newport during the 2019–20 season with 13 goals in all competitions. The season was terminated with ten league matches unplayed due to the Coronavirus pandemic.

2020–21 season
On 22 September 2020, Amond scored the third Newport County goal when they beat Championship club Watford 3–1 at home in the third round of the EFL Cup. The win meant the club had reached the fourth round of the EFL Cup for the first time in the club's history. Newport were drawn at home to Premier League club Newcastle United and lost on penalties after drawing 1–1. Amond was again top scorer for Newport during the 2020–21 with nine goals in all competitions. Amond played for Newport in the League Two playoff final at Wembley Stadium on 31 May 2021 which Newport lost to Morecambe, 1–0 after a 107th-minute penalty. Amond was released by Newport County at the end of the 2021–22 season.

Exeter City (loan)
On 10 August 2021, Amond joined League Two side Exeter City on loan for the remainder of the 2021–22 season. He made his debut for Exeter on 15 August 2021 as a second-half substitute in the 3–0 League Two defeat to Leyton Orient. Amond scored his first two goals for Exeter in the 5-3 EFL Trophy win against Bristol Rovers on 10 November 2021. In May 2022 Amond was part of the Exeter city squad that finished second in League Two, gaining automatic promotion to League One.

Woking
On 22 June 2022, Amond agreed to join National League side Woking ahead of his release from Newport, signing a two-year deal. Amond made his debut in a 2–0 loss away to York City in the first game of the season, a week later he would make his home debut in a 2–0 win against Dagenham and Redbridge. Despite registering 5 league assists, Amond struggled to find his first goal for the club until 15 October 2022 when he scored his first club goal from a direct free kick in a 2–1 win against Southend United in the FA Cup. On the 14th of February 2023 Amond scored his 10th goal of the season in a 2–2 away draw against AFC Wrexham at this point in the season he had also registered 8 assists.

International career
Amond earned his first cap for the Republic of Ireland U21 team against Austria on 19 August 2008. He made his second appearance for the team in Bulgaria and his first start against Portugal. He earned his fourth cap in October 2008 in Lithuania.

He received his first call-up to the senior national team in March 2019.

Personal life
Amond writes articles as a sports columnist for the local newspaper in his native county of Carlow, The Nationalist.

Amond was a National Citizen Service Ambassador for the 2016–17 season, joining 40 footballers from across the country in pledging their support for the youth empowerment scheme. He has a brother named Aaron.

Career statistics

Honours

Club
Shamrock Rovers
League of Ireland First Division: 2006

Sligo Rovers
FAI Cup: 2010
League of Ireland Cup: 2010

Paços de Ferreira
Portuguese League Cup runner-up: 2010–11

Grimsby Town
National League play-offs: 2016 
FA Trophy runner-up: 2015–16

Exeter City
League Two: runner-up: 2021–22

Individual
 National League Team of the Year: 2015–16
 Shamrock Rovers Young Player of the Year: 2008
 Grimsby Town Player of the Year: 2015–16
Newport County Player of the Year: 2018–19

References

External links

1988 births
Living people
Sportspeople from County Carlow
League of Ireland players
Republic of Ireland association footballers
Republic of Ireland under-21 international footballers
Association football forwards
Shamrock Rovers F.C. players
Kildare County F.C. players
Sligo Rovers F.C. players
F.C. Paços de Ferreira players
Accrington Stanley F.C. players
Morecambe F.C. players
Grimsby Town F.C. players
Hartlepool United F.C. players
Newport County A.F.C. players
Exeter City F.C. players
Woking F.C. players
Primeira Liga players
English Football League players
Republic of Ireland under-23 international footballers
Carlow inter-county hurlers
Irish expatriate sportspeople in Portugal
Irish expatriate sportspeople in England
Republic of Ireland expatriate association footballers
Expatriate footballers in England
Expatriate footballers in Portugal